Iraq competed at the 2020 Summer Paralympics in Tokyo, Japan, from 24 August to 5 September 2021.

Medalists

Competitors

Archery

Archery at the 2020 Summer Paralympics – Men's individual compound open - SULAIMAN Sulaiman

Archery at the 2020 Summer Paralympics – Women's individual recurve open - AL-SAEDI Zaman

Athletics 

Six athletes will be representing Iraq at the 2020 Summer Paralympics including reigning Paralympic champion Garrah Tnaiash in the men's shot put F40.

Powerlifting

Table tennis

Women

Wheelchair fencing 

Wheelchair fencing at the 2020 Summer Paralympics – Men's foil A - AL-MADHKHOORI Zainulabdeen

Wheelchair fencing at the 2020 Summer Paralympics – Men's épée A - AL-MADHKHOORI Zainulabdeen

Wheelchair fencing at the 2020 Summer Paralympics – Men's épée B - ALI Ammar

Wheelchair fencing at the 2020 Summer Paralympics – Men's sabre B - ALI Ammar

Wheelchair fencing at the 2020 Summer Paralympics – Men's épée team - AL-MADHKHOORI Zainulabdeen / ALI Ammar / AL-OGAILI Hayder

See also 
 Iraq at the Paralympics
 Iraq at the 2020 Summer Olympics

References

External links 
 2020 Summer Paralympics website

Nations at the 2020 Summer Paralympics
2020
Summer Paralympics